The Burundian Honours System consists of orders and medals awarded for exemplary service to the nation.

Orders

References